Empire Engineer was a  refrigerated cargo ship that was built in 1921 as Canadian Commander by Canadian Vickers Ltd, Montreal, Quebec, Canada. She was sold to an Italian firm in 1932 and renamed Giaocchino Lauro. She was seized by the United Kingdom in 1940, passed to the Ministry of War Transport (MoWT) and renamed Empire Engineer.

Description
The SS Empire Engineer was built in 1920 by Canadian Vickers Ltd, Montreal. She was yard number 79.

The engine was built by Canadian Vickers Ltd, Montreal. She had  of refrigerated cargo space. Refrigeration machinery was by the Lightfoot Refrigeration Co Ltd.

History
Canadian Commander was launched in 1920, with completion in April 1921. She was built for the Canadian Government and operated by the Canadian Government Merchant Marine Ltd (GCMM). Her port of registry was Montreal, under the British flag. The United Kingdom Official Number 141832 and Code Letters TQDW were allocated. On 3 July 1922, Canadian Commander ran aground at Saint Pierre and Miquelon. She was refloated on 16 July. Following the demise of CGMM in 1928, Canadian Commander was transferred to Canadian Commander Ltd and placed under the management of Canadian National Steamships Ltd.

In 1932, Canadian Commander was sold to Achille Lauro, Naples, Italy and renamed Gioacchino Lauro. Her port of registry was Naples. The Italian Official Number 383 was allocated. From 1934, her Code Letters were IBOG. On 10 June 1940, Gioacchino Lauro was in port at Hartlepool, Co Durham when Italy declared war against the United Kingdom. The ship and her cargo were seized as a prize of war, Gioacchino Lauro was passed to the MoWT and renamed Empire Engineer.

Empire Engineer was placed under the management of Weidner, Hopkins & Co Ltd. She regained her previous Official Number. The Code Letters GLYG were allocated. Her port of registry was West Hartlepool, Co Durham.

Little is known of her war service. She was a member of Convoy OA 216, which departed from Methil, Fife on 18 September 1940 and joined Convoy OB 216 at sea on 21 September. Empire Engineer was in ballast and bound for Baltimore, Maryland. Empire Engineer was a member of Convoy SC 20, which departed from Halifax, Nova Scotia, Canada on 22 January 1941 and arrived at Liverpool, Lancashire, United Kingdom on 8 February. She was carrying a cargo of steel ingots bound for Newport, Monmouthshire. Empire Engineer straggled behind the convoy. Although some survivors were known to have taken to liferafts, all 39 crew were lost. They are commemorated on the Tower Hill Memorial, London.

References

External links
Photo of Gioacchino Lauro

1920 ships
Ships built in Quebec
Steamships of Canada
Merchant ships of Canada
Maritime incidents in 1922
Steamships of Italy
Merchant ships of Italy
World War II merchant ships of Italy
Empire ships
Ministry of War Transport ships
Steamships of the United Kingdom
Maritime incidents in February 1941
World War II shipwrecks in the Atlantic Ocean
Ships sunk by German submarines in World War II
Ships lost with all hands